State Route 117 (SR 117) is a  state highway that runs southeast-to-northwest in an upside down question mark around McRae. It travels through portions of Telfair, Dodge, and Laurens counties in the central part of the U.S. state of Georgia. It connects Lumber City with the Dublin, Georgia, micropolitan area, via Jacksonville and Eastman.

Route description
SR 117 begins at an intersection with US 23/US 341/SR 27 (Golden Isles Highway), in Lumber City, within Telfair County. It heads to the southwest, and intersects the southern terminus of SR 149 Connector (Big Horse Creek Road). The route continues to the southwest and meets US 319/US 441/SR 31 in Jacksonville. Heading to the northwest, it intersects the southern terminus of SR 165 and the southwestern terminus of SR 132, before crossing into Dodge County and entering the town of Rhine. There, it intersects US 280/SR 30/S 165 (2nd Street). At this intersection, SR 117/SR 165 head to the north on a very brief concurrency. After the concurrency ends, SR 117 travels through rural areas of the county and intersects SR 87 (Abbeville Highway), just before entering Eastman. In Eastman, they first meet US 341/SR 27 (Terry Coleman Parkway). Just to the northeast is US 23/US 341 Business/SR 27 Business (Oak 
Street). At this intersection, SR 27 Business turns onto SR 46 west, while SR 117 turns onto SR 46 east, and US 23/US 341 Business/SR 87 continue straight ahead. Less than  later, SR 117 splits off to continue to the northeast. It enters Laurens County shortly before passing through the town of Cadwell. There, it has an intersection with SR 126 (Burch Street). Just before leaving town is the southern terminus of SR 338 (Dexter Street). To the northeast is the town of Rentz. It is unclear whether SR 117 is signed between this intersection or not. US 319/US 441/SR 31/SR 117 travel in a northward direction through rural areas of the county until they enter Dublin. Just inside the city limits is an interchange with Interstate 16 (I-16; Jim Gillis Historic Savannah Parkway). The four highways curve to the north-northeast and intersect the southern terminus of US 441 Bypass. At this intersection, US 319/US 441/SR 31 continue into the main part of town, while US 441 Bypass/SR 117 bypass it to the west. They travel to the west-northwest and curve to the northwest and intersect SR 257. They leave the city limits, cross over a Georgia Central Railway line, and curve to the north and intersect US 80/SR 19/SR 26 southeast of the W. H. 'Bud' Barron Airport. The two highways curve to the northeast and curve back to a northerly direction, until they meet their northern terminus, an intersection with US 441/SR 29.

SR 117 is not part of the National Highway System, a system of roadways important to the nation's economy, defense, and mobility.

History

Major intersections

See also

References

External links
 
 Georgia Roads (Routes 101-120)

117
Transportation in Telfair County, Georgia
Transportation in Dodge County, Georgia
Transportation in Laurens County, Georgia
Dublin, Georgia micropolitan area